Charles Crandall may refer to:

 Charles Henry Crandall (1858–1923), American author and poet
 Charles Martin Crandall (1833–1905), American inventor and toy-maker